Sky Cinema may refer to:
 Sky Cinema, a group of film channels on Sky UK and Ireland, formerly Sky Movies
 Sky Cinema, the previous name of two Sky Movies channels on Sky UK and Ireland from 1998 to 2007
 Sky Cinema (Germany), a group of German film channels on Sky Deutschland, formerly Sky Film
 Sky Cinema, a flagship channel of Sky Cinema Germany, formerly Premiere 1, 2 and 3
 Sky Cinema (Italy), a group of Italian film channels on Sky Italia